Tillandsia bulbosa, the bulbous airplant, is a species of flowering plant in the genus Tillandsia. It is widespread across Central America, the West Indies, southern Mexico (Chiapas, Tabasco, Veracruz, Yucatán Peninsula), and northern and eastern South America (Venezuela, Colombia, the Guianas, Bahia, Espírito Santo, Alagoas, Amapá, Pernambuco).

Cultivars 
 Tillandsia 'Canina'
 Tillandsia 'Chanza'
 Tillandsia 'First Born'
 Tillandsia 'Hyde's Silver'
 Tillandsia 'Joel'
 Tillandsia 'June Bug'
 Tillandsia 'Kacey'
 Tillandsia 'Mark Goddard'
 Tillandsia 'Rechoncho'
 Tillandsia 'Royal Sceptre'
 Tillandsia 'Showtime'
 Tillandsia 'Timm's Twister'
 |Tillandsia 'Veteran'

References 

bulbosa
Flora of Mexico
Flora of Central America
Flora of South America
Flora of the Caribbean
Plants described in 1825